A retractable hardtop — also known as "coupé convertible" or "coupé cabriolet" — is a car with an automatically operated, self-storing hardtop, as opposed to the folding textile-based roof used by traditional convertible cars.

The benefits of improved climate control and security are traded off against increased mechanical complexity, cost, weight and often reduced luggage capacity.

A 2006 New York Times article suggested the retractable hardtop may herald the demise of the textile-roofed convertible, and a 2007 Wall Street Journal article suggested "more and more convertibles are eschewing soft cloth tops in favor of sophisticated folding metal roofs, making them practical in all climates, year-round."

History 

1919 Ben P. Ellerbeck conceived a retractable hardtop – a manually operated system on a Hudson coupe that allowed unimpeded use of the rumble seat even with the top down – but never saw production.

1931 Georges Paulin made his idea public by applying for patent on a detachable hard roof design, that could ultimately be moved and stowed automatically in a car's rear luggage compartment, under a reverse-hinged rear-deck lid. 
1932 The French patent system granted Paulin patent number 733.380 for his Eclipse roof system, on July 5, 1932.

1934 Paulin's Eclipse retractable hard roof  was first presented on the Peugeot 401D Éclipse Décapotable, a low convertible coupé. In 1933, Paulin showed his designs to premier coachbuilder Marcel Pourtout, who hired him as lead designer, and in 1934 they equipped first a Peugeot 401D, followed by a 601C, with "Eclipse" roofs and bodywork, on chassis provided by Emile Darl'mat. In the same year, a Lancia Belna, a French-built Lancia Augusta, was also built as an Eclipse.

1935 Peugeot purchased Paulin's patent, and introduced the first factory production, power-operated, retractable hardtop in 1935, the "402BL Éclipse Décapotable", of which some 470 were built.
Pourtout kept building custom examples, designed by Paulin, on other makes like Delage and Panhard, and "Eclipse" coupé-convertibles based on the Peugeot 301, 401, 601, 302, and 402.

1941 Chrysler introduced a retractable hardtop concept car, the Chrysler Thunderbolt.

1947 American Playboy Automobile Company marketed one of the first series produced convertibles, with a retractable roof consisting of more than one section. Ninety-seven production models were made, until their bankruptcy in 1951.

1953 Ford Motor Company spent an estimated US$2 million (US$ in  dollars) to engineer a Continental Mark II with a servo-operated retractable roof. The project was headed by Ben Smith, a 30-year-old draftsman. The concept was rejected for cost and marketing reasons. Engineering work was recycled to the Ford Division which used the retractable mechanism in their 1957-1959 flagship Ford Fairlane 500 Skyliner after an estimated US$18 million (US$ in  dollars) more was spent.

1955 Brothers Ed and Jim Gaylord showed their first prototype at the 1955 Paris motor show, but the car failed to reach production.

1957 Ford introduced the Fairlane 500 Skyliner in the United States. A total of 48,394 were built from 1957 to 1959. The retractable top was noted for its complexity and usually decent reliability in the pre-transistor era. The Skyliner was a halo car with little luggage space (i.e., practicality), and cost twice that of a baseline Ford sedan.

1989 Toyota introduced a modern retractable hardtop, the MZ20 Soarer Aerocabin. The car featured an electric folding hardtop and was marketed as a 2-seater with a cargo area behind the front seats. Production was 500 units.

1995 The Mitsubishi GTO Spyder by ASC was marketed in the U.S. The design was further popularized by such cars as the 1996 Mercedes-Benz SLK. and 2001 Peugeot 206 CC.

2006 Peugeot presented a concept four-door retractable hardtop convertible, the Peugeot 407 Macarena. Produced by French coachbuilding specialist Heuliez, the Macarena's top can be folded in about 30 seconds. It has a reinforcing beam behind the front seats which incorporates LCD screens into the crossmember for the rear passengers.

Construction 

Retractable hardtops are commonly made from between two and five sections of metal or plastic and often rely on complex dual-hinged trunk/boot lids that enable the trunk lid to both receive the retracting top from the front and also receive parcels or luggage from the rear. The trunk also often includes a divider mechanism to prevent loading of luggage that would conflict with the operation of the hardtop.

Variations 
 The Volkswagen Eos features a five-segment retractable roof where one section is itself an independently sliding transparent sunroof.
 The Mercedes SL hardtop features a glass section that rotates during retraction to provide a more compact "stack."
 The third-generation Mazda MX-5 was available with an optional power retractable hardtop, in lieu of the standard folding-textile soft-top. Compared to the regular soft-top, the hardtop weighed  more yet had no reduction in cargo capacity. The MX-5 was one of the few cars offering both hardtop and soft-top convertible choices. The hardtop roof was constructed of polycarbonate and manufactured by the German firm Webasto.
 The Chrysler Sebring's (and its successor the Chrysler 200's) retractable hardtop also is marketed alongside a soft-top. According to development engineer Dave Lauzun, during construction, the Karmann-made tops are dropped into a body that is largely identical: both soft-top and retractable feature the same automatic tonneau cover, luggage divider and luggage space. The retractable does feature an underbody cross-brace not included in the softtop.

Comparison with soft tops 
The retractable hardtop's advantages include:
 More weatherly when roof is raised
 More secure than fabric tops
 Increased structural rigidity
 May enable consolidation/simplification of a manufacturer's car lineup; for instance the BMW Z4 (E89) was offered only as a coupé-convertible (hardtop), compared to the preceding E85 generation that had separate coupé and cabriolet (soft-top) variants.

The retractable hardtop's disadvantages include:
 Higher initial cost
 Increased mechanical complexity
 Potentially diminished passenger and trunk space compared to a soft-top convertible. 
 Higher weight and center of gravity than soft-top convertibles, potentially reducing handling.
 Potential need for more than minimum clearance while operating the hardtop. For example, the Volvo C70 requires  of vertical clearance during operation, the Cadillac XLR requires  of vertical clearance and the Mercedes SLK's trunk lid extends rearward while lowering or lifting the top.

List of retractable hardtop models

Gallery

References

Automotive styling features
Automotive technologies